The Chali, the Latinized form of Khaloi or Chaloi (Χάλοι), were identified by Ptolemy in his Geography as a Germanic tribe in Jutland. Nearly all of the Germanic tribes identified by Ptolemy have left traces of their existence beyond their mention in Geography, such as through medieval traditions or place names, however, no such traces have been identified for the Chali.

Citations

Sources

See also 
List of Germanic peoples

Early Germanic peoples